Złota Góra may refer to the following places:
Złota Góra, Łódź Voivodeship (central Poland)
Złota Góra, Ostrołęka County in Masovian Voivodeship (east-central Poland)
Złota Góra, Chojnice County in Pomeranian Voivodeship (north Poland)
Złota Góra, Kartuzy County in Pomeranian Voivodeship (north Poland)